The Razorback Marching Band (nicknamed the "Best in Sight and Sound") is the marching band of the University of Arkansas in Fayetteville, Arkansas. The 350+ RMB performs at all home football games (in Fayetteville, Little Rock, & Dallas) as well as all post season play (SEC Championship and/or Bowl Game). A small pep band travels to football games played elsewhere.

History
In 1874, The University of Arkansas Razorback band was originally formed as the Cadet Corps Band. It was formed as a part of the Military Art Department in the University of Arkansas's fourth year of operation which makes it one of the oldest collegiate bands in the United States. The Cadet Corps Band served in many functions of the campus life, not keeping exclusively to military events, but also played in football games, pageants, and commencement exercises.

On June 5, 1924, the Lambda chapter of Kappa Kappa Psi honorary band fraternity, was formed at the University of Arkansas. The fraternity's purpose was, and is to this day, to promote the existence and welfare of the University Band. In the time period directly following World War II, the Arkansas band enjoyed a time period of what could be considered steady growth.

In 1947 the band divided into three bands: an American football band, a concert band, and an R.O.T.C. band.

In 1948, E.J. Marty became the Director of Bands and turned the 42 piece football band into the famous "Marching 100", known throughout America as one of the best bands in the nation.

On November 11, 1950, the Psi chapter of Tau Beta Sigma honorary band sorority, was founded at the University of Arkansas. Together with the Lambda chapter of Kappa Kappa Psi, they have aided in transforming the musical organization at Arkansas.

In 1956, Dr. Richard A. "Doc" Worthington became Director of Bands during a slump in band enrollment. Dr. Worthington was quickly able to turn the "Hopeful 78" into the University of Arkansas Razorback Marching Band.

In 1995, Professor Eldon Janzen, Director of Bands and Lambda Chapter Sponsor, retired after leading the band after almost three decades. The University of Arkansas awarded him with the title "Director of Bands, Emeritus", the first such title to be given to any band director at the University of Arkansas.

In 2009, Mr. Timothy Gunter, stepped down as Head Director of the Razorback Marching Band, after 14 years as a director of the Athletic Bands.

In 2012, Dr. Christopher Knighten was promoted from Director of Athletic Bands to Director of Bands.

In 2014, Dr. Benjamin Lorenzo was promoted to Director of the Razorback Marching Band.

In 2022, Dr. Jeffrey Summers was promoted to Director of the Razorback Marching Band.

Leadership

Staff
Dr. Jeffrey Summers is the Associate Director of Bands at the University of Arkansas where he teaches courses in conducting, Wind Symphony, and others within the Department of Music. In 2022, Dr. Summers was named Director of Athletic Bands and Director of the Razorback Marching Band.

Mr. Chase Jones has been the Assistant Director of the Razorback Marching Band since 2022.  In 2022, Mr. Jones was made Director of the Hogwild Pep Band, the school's smaller pep band that attends sporting events other than football, such as basketball and volleyball.

Student Leadership

The University of Arkansas Marching Band has several student leadership positions, the most visible of which are the drum majors who lead the band on the field and direct the band in the stands.  Drum major auditions start with an interview of each applicant by the directors and graduate teaching assistants.  Those who pass the interview stage are invited to a teaching session, where each person gives a mock lesson on marching technique.  Lastly, the best of these compete in front of the entire band by demonstrating the traditional drum major run-out, and then by leading the band in stands tunes.

Each section has one or two Section Leaders, depending on the size of the section.  They oversee their section during sectional rehearsals, which could cover music or marching technique. During trips and other events, the drum majors often rely on the section leaders to help organize the band before parades and other performances. Section leaders are also responsible for administrative tasks for their sections such as ensuring attendance at events, and seeing that all necessary forms are filled out by their section members.

The section is further divided into small groups led by Squad Leaders. The drill captain is responsible for instruction and demonstration of marching fundamentals and distribution of drill cards.

The band usually has one or more students functioning as Librarians. They are responsible for ensuring that music, drill sheets, etc. are printed and ready for rehearsals, in addition to managing the band library. Other student leadership positions are offered through participation in the band service organizations.

References

External links
 Official website - University of Arkansas Band
 University of Arkansas Drumline

1874 establishments in Arkansas
Marching Band
Southeastern Conference marching bands
Musical groups from Arkansas
Musical groups established in 1874